Ascent Uptown is a 33-story apartment building in Uptown Charlotte, North Carolina.
of floor area.

 of amenities is spread over two floors.  The features include a three-room fitness center, sky lounge, pool, community kitchen, private workspaces as well as multiple entertainment and lounge spaces.  The rooftop will feature a swimming pool and spacious sundeck, cabanas, grilling stations and fire pit.  The first floor features a farm to table restaurant called Haymaker.  The restaurant will provide room service to resident which includes seasonal menus and craft cocktails.

The apartment range in size from studio, one- and two-bedroom apartments and penthouses with the largest unit featuring .  Each unit has floor to ceiling windows, quartz countertops, custom high-gloss cabinetry, Bosch and GE appliances and Bluetooth entry locks.

Construction began on February 1, 2015, and Ascent Uptown is the 6th residential building to begin construction in Uptown Charlotte since the end of the Great Recession.

Ascent Uptown was constructed between W 3rd Street and S Poplar Street. It opened on June 19, 2017.

It is owned by Greystar Real Estate Partners and was constructed on a build-to-rent basis.

See also
 List of tallest buildings in North Carolina / the United States / the world
 List of tallest buildings in Charlotte, North Carolina

References

Residential skyscrapers in Charlotte, North Carolina
Residential buildings completed in 2017